Moisés Casales (born 4 September 1958) is a Cuban handball player. He competed in the men's tournament at the 1980 Summer Olympics.

References

1958 births
Living people
Cuban male handball players
Olympic handball players of Cuba
Handball players at the 1980 Summer Olympics
Place of birth missing (living people)